KF Mirdita is an Albanian football club based in the small municipality of Mirditë. They are currently competing in the Kategoria e Tretë.

References

 
Mirditë
Football clubs in Albania
1950 establishments in Albania
Association football clubs established in 1950
Albanian Third Division clubs